Sakamoto Dam is an arch dam located in Nara prefecture in Japan. The dam is used for power generation. The catchment area of the dam is 101 km2. The dam impounds about 259  ha of land when full and can store 87000 thousand cubic meters of water. The construction of the dam was started on 1959 and completed in 1962.

References

Dams in Nara Prefecture
1962 establishments in Japan